Headwind is a wind that blows against the direction of travel.

Headwind may also refer to:
 Stewart Headwind, a homebuilt aircraft
 "Headwind" (song), from the 2019 album You Deserve Love by White Reaper
 Headwinds, a 2011 French film
 A component of a crosswind